Nahar-e Khurlat (also Romanized as Nahār-e Khūrlāt) is a village in Siahkalrud Rural District, Chaboksar District, Rudsar County, Gilan Province, Iran. At the 2006 census, its population was 22, in 6 families.

References 

Populated places in Rudsar County